Protolepidodendropsis is a genus of lycopsid known from fossil forests dating from early Late Devonian strata in Svalbard.

Fossil forests of Protolepidodendropsis pulchra have been recovered from sandstone and mudstone of the Plantekløfta Formation, estimated to be around 380 million years old. Their height is unknown but estimated to be around 2 to 4 m.

References

Devonian plants
Prehistoric lycophytes
Prehistoric lycophyte genera